Anyaa Sowutuom, popularly simply called Sowutuom, is a suburban town near  Omanjor in the Greater Accra Region of Ghana. In 2012, Ga Central District was created with Sowutuom as its capital.

It has several tertiary education institutions, and a soccer team including the Pentecost University and Sowutuom United fc

Member of Parliament
 Doctor Kissi

Universities
 Maranatha University
 Pentecost University

Seminary
The Roman Catholic Archdiocese of Accra set up the St. Paul's Catholic Seminary in 1988 which has produced over 500 priests since its inception.

Police Station
The Sowutuom police Station is situated near the St. Paul's Catholic Seminary.

See also

 Geography of Ghana

References

Populated places in the Greater Accra Region